Cerro Wawashang Natural Reserve is a nature reserve in Nicaragua. It is one of the 78 reserves that are under official protection in the country.

External links
 Wawashang Natural Reserve - Explore Nicaragua

Protected areas of Nicaragua
South Caribbean Coast Autonomous Region